Phlyctis lueckingii is a species of corticolous (bark-dwelling) lichen in the family Phlyctidaceae. Found in Sri Lanka, it was formally described as a new species by Gothamie Weerakoon and André Aptroot in 2016. The type was collected on the Dothalugala mountain, where it was found in a rainforest on the smooth bark of a tree. The species epithet honours lichenologist Robert Lücking.

Characteristics of the lichen include its relatively large (0.2–0.3 mm in diameter), grey apothecia that occur in groups, and its fusiform (spindle-shaped) ascospores that have 7 septa and measure 27–29 by 5.5–6.5 μm. The thallus contains the lichen product norstictic acid.

References

Gyalectales
Lichen species
Lichens described in 2016
Taxa named by André Aptroot
Taxa named by Gothamie Weerakoon
Lichens of Sri Lanka